"Anselma" is a song written by César Suedan and Guadalupe Trigo, produced by T-Bone Burnett and Steve Berlin, and performed by American band Los Lobos for their EP ...And a Time to Dance in 1983. The song earned the first Grammy Award for Best Mexican/Mexican-American Performance at the 26th Grammy Awards.

References

1983 songs
Grammy Award for Best Mexican/Mexican-American Album
Los Lobos songs
Song recordings produced by T Bone Burnett
Spanish-language songs